Frank Booth may refer to:

 Frank Booth (English footballer) (1882–1919), English football player for Manchester City F.C. and the England national team
 Frank Booth (American soccer) (1887–1955), American soccer player from Fall River, Massachusetts
 Frank Booth (cricketer) (1907–1980), English cricketer who played for Lancashire CCC
 Frank Booth (swimmer) (1910–1980), American swimmer who won a silver medal in the 1932 Olympics
 Frank Booth (Australian footballer) (1916–1974), Australian footballer for Collingwood and Hawthorn
 Frank Booth (Blue Velvet), the villain from the film Blue Velvet